The 1989–90 season was Manchester United's 88th season in the Football League, and their 15th consecutive season in the top division of English football.

The season brought their lowest league finish since their relegation from the First Division 15 years earlier, as they finished 13th in the league, and by Christmas there were continued calls from fans for Alex Ferguson to be sacked as manager. However, the season ended on a high as United won the FA Cup by beating Crystal Palace 1–0 in a replay after drawing the first game 3–3. It was their first major trophy for five years, and their first since the appointment of Alex Ferguson as manager.

It also saw them enter European competition as England's representatives in the 1990–91 European Cup Winners' Cup following the end of the ban on English clubs in European competition arising from the Heysel Stadium disaster of 1985.

1989–90 saw Mark Hughes top the club's goalscoring charts for the second year running, while the club welcomed four new major signings in the early part of the season – Danny Wallace, Neil Webb, Paul Ince and Gary Pallister.

Young striker Mark Robins enjoyed regular appearances in the first team this season, often as a substitute, and scored 10 goals - including the winning goal against Nottingham Forest in the third round of the FA Cup. Lee Martin, who scored the winning goal in the FA Cup final replay, became the club's regular left-back this season.

This season also saw the attempted purchase of the club by businessman Michael Knighton after chairman Martin Edwards considered selling the club for a reported £10 million. The sale fell through after Knighton was found to not have the money required to maintain the club. This period is best remembered for Knighton – wearing a United kit and tracksuit top – performing a keepie uppie routine before the opening game of the season at home to Arsenal. According to Alex Ferguson in his autobiography; Managing My Life (published nearly a decade later), this display of showboating annoyed Ferguson as he felt it was detrimental to his teams' preparation for the forthcoming match – although United did go on to win the game 4–1 against the defending champions.

Ferguson also revealed in the autobiography that in spite of Manchester United's dismal form during the first half of the season, he was assured by the club's directors that his position as manager was never at risk; although naturally disappointed with the club's lack of progress in the league, they understood the reason for this - namely that a number of key players, including Neil Webb, were unavailable for long spells due to injury. However, Ferguson also admitted in his autobiography that had he not achieved success with United that season, he feared that fan and media pressure on the club's board to sack him could eventually have become irresistible. There had been numerous calls from fans during the season for Ferguson to be sacked, and media reports had suggested that the former Everton manager Howard Kendall would be appointed as his successor; Kendall was appointed by United's local rivals Manchester City during the season. Similarly, there were also reports that Knighton wanted to recruit England manager Bobby Robson, who had announced his intention to stand down after the 1990 FIFA World Cup; the collapse of Knighton’s takeover rendered this moot, and Robson instead became manager of PSV Eindhoven after the World Cup.

Pre-season and friendlies

First Division

FA Cup

League Cup

Events of the season
Alex Ferguson began his fourth season as Manchester United manager desperate to bring a major trophy–and ultimately the league title–to Old Trafford for the first time in his reign. During the close season, he brought in Mike Phelan signs from Norwich City for £750,000 and Neil Webb from Nottingham Forest for £1.5 million, rebuilding his midfield following the sale of Gordon Strachan to Leeds United for £300,000 and midfielder Norman Whiteside to Everton for £750,000. Paul McGrath was sold to Aston Villa for £400,000, with Ferguson making an approach for Swedish defender Glenn Hysen, but lost out to Liverpool. By the end of the first month of the season, he had brought in Middlesbrough defender Gary Pallister for a club record fee of £2.3 million–also a national record for a defender and the second highest fee to be paid by an English club. Ferguson then signed Paul Ince, the 21-year-old West Ham United midfielder, for £1.7 million after a long wait that resulted from a failed medical.

Just 48 hours before the First Division campaign kicked off, Martin Edwards was reportedly on the verge of selling control of Manchester United for a deal in the region of £20 million, nine years after he inherited control of the club from his late father Louis. The next day, Michael Knighton, a 37-year-old property developer, agreed a takeover deal for the club.

The First Division season began with an excellent 4–1 home win over defending champions Arsenal. The goals come from Steve Bruce, Mark Hughes, Brian McClair and the debutant Neil Webb, raising hopes that 1989–90 could finally be the season where the league title returned to United.

However, by 9 September, United had lost three league games in a row and unrest was growing among the fans, prompting rumours that Ferguson could be on the verge of dismissal. Some reports even suggested that the former Everton manager Howard Kendall was about to be appointed as manager of Manchester United, but the board denied that Ferguson's position was at risk. By Christmas, Kendall was indeed in Manchester, but as manager of City rather than United.

On 16 September, Danny Wallace moved to Manchester United for £1.2 million, giving United a much needed boost on the left wing following the dismal form of Ralph Milne, who was signed last year, and a more experienced alternative to the 18-year-old Lee Sharpe.

Five days after Wallace's arrival, Martin Edwards agreed to sell his controlling interest in Manchester United to Michael Knighton for £20 million.

23 September saw the first Manchester derby for three seasons, and it was a catastrophic one for United as they were defeated 5–1 at Maine Road by City. leaving them 14th in the First Division with seven points from their first seven games.

Despite Manchester United's erratic start to the season, the board offered Alex Ferguson a new contract with the club to take him up to the end of the 1992–93 season, and he accepted it.

By mid October, Michael Knighton had pulled out of his takeover bid, and accepted a non-executive role on the board of directors.

Later that month, Manchester United's hopes of winning the League Cup for the first time were ended with a 3–0 home defeat by Tottenham Hotspur in the third round.

On 30 December 1989, Manchester United played their final game of the 1980s, a 2–2 draw at Wimbledon, meaning that they had gone without a win since 18 November and were 15th in the First Division, just two points above the relegation zone. What had been anticipated as a title challenge appeared to have dissolved into a relegation battle, but the board continued to stand by Alex Ferguson and insisted that he will not be sacked; though naturally disappointed by the lack of success in the league, they understood the reasons; not least the injury crisis which had plagued the club constantly since the previous autumn.

On 7 January 1990, a goal by 20-year-old striker Mark Robins gave Manchester United a 1–0 win at Nottingham Forest in the FA Cup third round. When the FA Cup third round draw was made a month earlier, many journalists anticipated the tie as the game that would end in defeat for United and drive Ferguson out of his job.

Later that month, a 2–0 defeat at Norwich City pushed Manchester United just one place and one point short of the relegation zone, but they continued to progress in the FA Cup as Clayton Blackmore scored the only goal of the game for a United side who eliminated Hereford United from the FA Cup in the fourth round tie at Edgar Street.

A month later, they progressed to the FA Cup sixth round for the second year running by defeating Newcastle United 3–2 at St James' Park, and three weeks after that they booked their place in the FA Cup semi-finals for the first time since they won the trophy in 1985, thanks to a 1–0 win over Sheffield United at Bramall Lane.

The FA Cup semi-final at Maine Road on 8 April ended in a 3–3 draw with Oldham Athletic. They got through to the final with a 2–1 win in the replay, where they would be paired with a Crystal Palace side managed by former United player Steve Coppell.

United's league season ended with a 13th-place finish and only beating relegation by five points–their lowest since relegation 16 years earlier.

On 12 May, Manchester United took to the field at Wembley against Crystal Palace in the FA Cup final at Wembley Stadium. 18 minutes into the game, Palace (who had never played in the final before) took the lead through Gary O'Reilly, only for Bryan Robson to equalise in the 35th minute. Mark Hughes put United ahead in the 62nd minute, but Palace equalised in the 72nd minute through Ian Wright. The scores were still level at full-time, and the match went into extra time. Just two minutes into extra time, Wright put Palace ahead and it looked as though the FA Cup would be heading to Selhurst Park for the first time ever. Then, with seven minutes of extra time remaining, Mark Hughes equalised to force a replay.

Goalkeeper Jim Leighton had been performing erratically for much of the 1989–90 season, and his form in the FA Cup final was no different. Alex Ferguson then decided to drop Leighton for the replay and draft in Les Sealey, who had joined on loan from Luton Town the previous December and only played for the club twice before.

The replay was played at Wembley on 17 May, and Sealey pulled off a series of spectacular saves in the first half to prevent Palace from taking the lead. In the 59th minute, Lee Martin fired in a pass from Neil Webb to score only the second goal of his career and give the trophy to United.

Three weeks after the final, Manchester United signed Republic of Ireland defender Denis Irwin, 24, from Oldham Athletic for £625,000, with Alex Ferguson intending to use him as a right-back with Mike Phelan being switched to midfield.

Squad statistics

Transfers

In

Out

Loan in

Loan out

Notes

References

Manchester United F.C. seasons
Manchester United